is a former Japanese football player.

Club statistics

References

External links

1982 births
Living people
Shizuoka Sangyo University alumni
Association football people from Shizuoka Prefecture
Japanese footballers
J2 League players
Thespakusatsu Gunma players
Association football midfielders